Steven Clifford (born 6 May 1955) is an Australian alpine skier. He competed in three events at the 1972 Winter Olympics.

References

1955 births
Living people
Australian male alpine skiers
Olympic alpine skiers of Australia
Alpine skiers at the 1972 Winter Olympics